Giraudia is a genus of parasitoid wasps belonging to the family Ichneumonidae.

The species of this genus are found in Europe and Northern America.

Species:
 Giraudia ferruginea (Cushman, 1935) 
 Giraudia fulva Townes & Gupta, 1962

References

Ichneumonidae
Hymenoptera genera